Bizdan (also Romanized as Bīzdān; also known as Bīzāb) is a village in Nasrovan Rural District, in the Central District of Darab County, Fars Province, Iran. At the 2006 census, its population was 206, in 47 families.

References 

Populated places in Darab County